Arina Ushakova may refer to:
Arina Ushakova (ice dancer) (born 2002), Russian figure skater competing in ice dance
Arina Ushakova (pair skater) (born 1989), Russian figure skater competing in pairs